Omar Brown (born June 6, 1988) is an American football free safety who is currently a free agent. Brown signed with the Baltimore Ravens as an undrafted free agent. Brown played college football at Marshall.

Early years
Brown was an All-state selection while at Berkeley High School of Moncks Corner, South Carolina. He was selected for All-Lowcountry Defensive Back of the Year.

College career
Brown played college football at Marshall. He finished college football with 288 tackles, 9 interceptions, 29 passes defended and 5 forced fumbles.

In his freshman year, Brown recorded 14 tackles, one pass defended and a forced fumble for the season.

In his sophomore year, Brown recorded 73 tackles, 2 interceptions and 12 passes defended for the season.

In his junior year, Brown finished the season with 88 tackles, 3 interceptions and 8 passes defended. On September 10, 2010, Brown had 11 tackles against 23rd ranked West Virginia but Marshall lost the game 24-21.

In his senior year, Brown finished the season with 113 tackles, 4 interceptions, 8 passes defended and 4 forced fumbles. On September 4, 2011, In the season opener against West Virginia he recorded 5 tackles in the game as Marshall lost 34-13. On September 10, 2011, he recorded 8 tackles and a forced fumble against Southern Mississippi as Marshall won the game 26-20. On September 17, 2011, In a regular season game against Ohio in which Brown had a team-leading 14 tackles and a pass deflection but Marshall lost the game 44-7. On September 24, 2011, he had a team-leading 17 tackles, one pass defended and a forced fumble against 13th ranked Virginia Tech as Marshall lost 30-10. In the next game against Louisville on October 1, 2011, he had 4 tackles, an interception, and a pass deflection.

Professional career

Baltimore Ravens
On May 11, 2012, Brown signed with the Baltimore Ravens as an undrafted free agent. On August 31, 2012, he was released. On September 1, 2012, he re-signed with the Baltimore Ravens to join the practice squad. On November 13, 2012, he was released from the practice squad to make room for quarterback Dennis Dixon. On November 20, he was re-signed to join the team's practice squad after doing a tryout for the Philadelphia Eagles. On December 12, 2012, he was promoted to the active roster from the practice squad. On December 23, 2012, in week 16 vs. the New York Giants, he recorded his first career sack on quarterback Eli Manning. He was promoted from the practice squad to the 53 man roster, taking the place of veteran Michael Huff who was waived by the team on October 30, 2013. The Ravens released Brown on August 25, 2014.

Personal life
He is the son of Estella Mckelvey and has two brothers named Kory Brown and Evan McKelvey who also play college football. Kory plays both safety and linebacker at The University of Kentucky and Evan plays linebacker at Marshall University.

References

External links

Marshall bio
Baltimore Ravens bio

1988 births
Living people
People from Moncks Corner, South Carolina
American football safeties
Marshall Thundering Herd football players
Baltimore Ravens players
Players of American football from South Carolina